Mostert is a Dutch and Afrikaans metonymic occupational surname. Meaning "mustard", it originally referred to a mustard miller or salesman. The Middle Dutch spelling Mostaert and modern Dutch spelling Mosterd are among variant forms of the surname. People with these surnames include:

Chaz Mostert (born 1992), Australian racing driver
Chris Mostert (born ca. 1950), Dutch saxophonist
Franco Mostert (born 1990), South African rugby player
Frederick Mostert (born 1959), South African trademark attorney and legal writer
Gerhard Mostert (born 1984), South African rugby player
 (born 1949), German football defender
 (1925–2002), Dutch correspondence chess player and president
Herman Mostert (born 1969), South African rugby player
JP Mostert (born 1988), South African rugby player
Joseph Mostert (1912–1967), Belgian middle-distance runner
Karla Mostert (born 1990), South African netball player
Mark Mostert (born 1950s), South African-born American non-fiction writer
Mary Mostert (1929–2016), American Mormon missionary and writer
Natasha Mostert, South African novelist and screenwriter
Nicol Mostert (born 1985), South African rugby player
Phil Mostert (1898–1972), South African rugby player
Raheem Mostert (born 1992), American football running back
Mostaert
Antoon Mostaert (1881–1971), Belgian Roman Catholic missionary in Inner Mongolia
Frans Mostaert (1528–1598), Flemish landscape painter, twin brother of Gillis
Gillis Mostaert (1528–1560), Flemish landscape painter, twin brother of Frans
Jan Mostaert (c.1475–1553), Dutch portrait painter, possibly grandfather of Frans and Gillis

See also
Mostert's Mill, historic windmill in Cape Town, South Africa
Moster (disambiguation)

References

Afrikaans-language surnames
Dutch-language surnames
Occupational surnames